Elisabeth Morgan Sullivan (born December 28, 1991) is an American soccer player who last played as a striker for Portland Thorns FC of the National Women's Soccer League (NWSL).

Club career 
Portland Thorns FC drafted Sullivan in 2014.

References

External links 
Mississippi State profile

Living people
1991 births
Women's association football forwards
Portland Thorns FC players
Mississippi State Bulldogs women's soccer players
National Women's Soccer League players
Soccer players from Memphis, Tennessee
Portland Thorns FC draft picks
American women's soccer players